The 2011 WNBA season was the 15th season for the Phoenix Mercury of the Women's National Basketball Association.

Transactions

WNBA Draft
The following are the Mercury's selections in the 2011 WNBA Draft.

Transaction log
February 9: The Mercury signed Brooke Smith, Sequoia Holmes, and Taylor Lilley to training camp contracts.
February 22: The Mercury signed Lauren Ervin to a training camp contract.
February 24: The Mercury signed Marie Ferdinand-Harris and Nakia Sanford.
February 25: The Mercury signed Alexis Gray-Lawson and Amanda Thompson.
March 14: The Mercury waived Sequoia Holmes and Brooke Smith.
April 10: The Mercury signed Erlana Larkins to a training camp contract.
April 11: The Mercury traded draft rights to Tahnee Robinson to the Connecticut Sun in exchange for a third-round pick in the 2012 Draft.
April 15: The Mercury waived Amanda Thompson.
April 22: The Mercury signed Yuko Oga and Olayinka Sanni to training camp contracts.
April 28: The Mercury waived Lauren Ervin.
May 19: The Mercury waived Erlana Larkins.
May 30: The Mercury waived Taylor Lilley and Brittany Spears.
June 2: The Mercury waived Yuko Oga.
August 4: The Mercury traded Kara Braxton to the New York Liberty in exchange for Sidney Spencer.
August 12: The Mercury signed Krystal Thomas and waived Olayinka Sanni.

Trades

Personnel changes

Additions

Subtractions

Roster

Depth

Season standings

Schedule

Preseason

|- align="center" bgcolor="bbffbb"
| 1 || May 24 || 10:00pm || Japan || 96–52 || Gray-Lawson (16) || Dupree (8) || Gray Lawson (6) || US Airways Center  2,969 || 1–0
|- align="center" bgcolor="ffbbbb"
| 2 || May 28 || 10:00pm || @ Los Angeles || 72–83 || 3 players (12) || Braxton (6) || 5 players (2) || The Pit  N/A || 1–1
|-

Regular season

|- align="center" bgcolor="ffbbbb"
| 1 || June 4 || 3:00pm || @ Seattle || ABC || 71–78 || Taurasi (31) || DupreeBraxton (9) || Taylor (5) || KeyArena  11,548 || 0–1
|- align="center" bgcolor="ffbbbb"
| 2 || June 10 || 10:30pm || @ Los Angeles ||  || 85–98 || Taylor (18) || Dupree (11) || Johnson (6) || Staples Center  10,616 || 0–2
|- align="center" bgcolor="ffbbbb"
| 3 || June 17 || 10:00pm || San Antonio || FS-A || 99–101 || Taurasi (20) || Dupree (12) || Taylor (10) || US Airways Center  12,274 || 0–3 
|- align="center" bgcolor="bbffbb"
| 4 || June 19 || 6:00pm || Indiana ||  || 93–89 (OT) || Taurasi (32) || Dupree (18) || Taylor (6) || US Airways Center  7,701 || 1–3
|- align="center" bgcolor="bbffbb"
| 5 || June 21 || 8:00pm || @ San Antonio || ESPN2 || 105–98 || Taylor (30) || Dupree (13) || Johnson (6) || AT&T Center  7,072 || 2–3 
|- align="center" bgcolor="bbffbb"
| 6 || June 24 || 7:30pm || @ Atlanta || FS-AFS-S || 92–83 || Taurasi (20) || Taylor (10) || Taylor (8) || Philips Arena  5,492 || 3–3 
|- align="center" bgcolor="bbffbb"
| 7 || June 25 || 8:00pm || @ Chicago || CN100 || 86–78 || Tauarsi (23) || BraxtonTaylor (9) || Taylor (7) || Allstate Arena  5,547 || 4–3 
|- align="center" bgcolor="ffbbbb"
| 8 || June 28 || 7:00pm || @ Indiana ||  || 86–91 || BonnerTaurasi (15) || Braxton (7) || Gray-LawsonTaylor (5) || Conseco Fieldhouse  6,625 || 4–4
|-

|- align="center" bgcolor="bbffbb"
| 9 || July 1 || 10:00pm || Chicago || NBATVCN100 || 97–84 || Taurasi (24) || Dupree (9) || Taurasi (6) || US Airways Center  9,517 || 5–4 
|- align="center" bgcolor="bbffbb"
| 10 || July 5 || 9:00pm || Los Angeles || ESPN2 || 101–82 || DupreeTaurasi (20) || Braxton (5) || Taurasi (7) || US Airways Center  9,826 || 6–4 
|- align="center" bgcolor="bbffbb"
| 11 || July 8 || 8:00pm || @ Tulsa ||  || 86–78 || Taurasi (17) || Bonner (13) || Taylor (7) || BOK Center  4,081 || 7–4 
|- align="center" bgcolor="bbffbb"
| 12 || July 10 || 6:00pm || Tulsa || NBATVCOX || 102–63 || Taylor (18) || Sanford (7) || Taurasi (6) || US Airways Center  7,696 || 8–4 
|- align="center" bgcolor="bbffbb"
| 13 || July 13 || 1:00pm || @ Minnesota || NBATVFS-AFS-N || 112–105 || Taurasi (27) || DupreeTaylor (8) || JohnsonTaurasiTaylor (8) || Target Center  11,820 || 9–4 
|- align="center" bgcolor="bbffbb"
| 14 || July 15 || 10:00pm || Washington || NBATVFS-A || 78–64 || Dupree (20) || Taylor (8) || Taylor (7) || US Airways Center  9,075 || 10–4 
|- align="center" bgcolor="ffbbbb"
| 15 || July 20 || 3:30pm || Minnesota || NBATVFS-A || 98–106 || Taurasi (24) || BonnerDupree (7) || Taurasi (6) || US Airways Center  12,118 || 10–5 
|-
| colspan="11" align="center" valign="middle" | All-Star break
|- align="center" bgcolor="ffbbbb"
| 16 || July 26 || 9:00pm || Seattle || NBATV || 77–83 || Taurasi (26) || BonnerBraxton (7) || Johnson (5) || US Airways Center  6,108 || 10–6 
|- align="center" bgcolor="ffbbbb"
| 17 || July 28 || 12:30pm || @ San Antonio || NBATVFS-AFS-SW || 91–102 || Taurasi (27) || Dupree (14) || JohnsonTaylor (5) || AT&T Center  14,797 || 10–7 
|- align="center" bgcolor="bbffbb"
| 18 || July 30 || 7:00pm || @ New York || NBATVMSG+ || 91–84 || Taylor (29) || Bonner (9) || Swanier (7) || Prudential Center  7,214 || 11–7 
|-

|- align="center" bgcolor="ffbbbb"
| 19 || August 2 || 8:00pm || @ Minnesota || ESPN2 || 73–90 || Taurasi (20) || Bonner (8) || Johnson (4) || Target Center  7,126 || 11–8 
|- align="center" bgcolor="ffbbbb"
| 20 || August 7 || 6:00pm || Connecticut || NBATVFS-A || 95–96 (OT) || Taurasi (29) || Dupree (12) || Taurasi (6) || US Airways Center  8,514 || 11–9 
|- align="center" bgcolor="bbffbb"
| 21 || August 9 || 10:00pm || Minnesota ||  || 85–80 || Taurasi (26) || Dupree (11) || Johnson (5) || US Airways Center  6,726 || 12–9 
|- align="center" bgcolor="bbffbb"
| 22 || August 11 || 10:00pm || Atlanta ||  || 109–95 || Bonner (25) || Bonner (13) || Taylor (6) || US Airways Center  7,940 || 13–9
|- align="center" bgcolor="ffbbbb"
| 23 || August 12 || 10:30pm || @ Los Angeles ||  || 90–93 (OT) || Taylor (29) || Bonner (10) || Johnson (12) || Staples Center  10,512 || 13–10 
|- align="center" bgcolor="bbffbb"
| 24 || August 16 || 10:00pm || Seattle ||  || 81–79 || Taurasi (24) || BonnerSanfordTaurasi (5) || JohnsonTaurasi (4) || US Airways Center  8,870 || 14–10 
|- align="center" bgcolor="bbffbb"
| 25 || August 20 || 10:00pm || San Antonio || NBATVFS-AFS-SW || 87–81 || Taylor (28) || Bonner (11) || Taylor (5) || US Airways Center  10,134 || 15–10 
|- align="center" bgcolor="ffbbbb"
| 26 || August 23 || 10:00pm || New York || ESPN2 || 70–74 || Dupree (17) || Taylor (9) || JohnsonTaylor (4) || US Airways Center  8,871 || 15–11
|- align="center" bgcolor="ffbbbb"
| 27 || August 26 || 7:30pm || @ Connecticut || CSN-NE || 92–95 || TaurasiTaylor (26) || DupreeSanford (11) || Johnson (7) || Mohegan Sun Arena  9,007 || 15–12 
|- align="center" bgcolor="bbffbb"
| 28 || August 28 || 4:00pm || @ Washington || NBATVCSN-MA || 86–79 || Dupree (27) || Sanford (9) || Johnson (8) || Verizon Center  11,614 || 16–12 
|- align="center" bgcolor="bbffbb"
| 29 || August 30 || 8:00pm || @ Tulsa ||  || 96–74 || Bonner (25) || BonnerSanford (9) || BonnerTaurasi (3) || BOK Center  3,590 || 17–12  
|-

|- align="center" bgcolor="ffbbbb"
| 30 || September 1 || 8:00pm || @ San Antonio ||  || 68–86 || Bonner (23) || Dupree (13) || SwanierTaurasi (3) || AT&T Center  6,502 || 17–13 
|- align="center" bgcolor="bbffbb"
| 31 || September 3 || 10:00pm || Los Angeles || NBATV || 93–77 || Taurasi (24) || Dupree (19) || Johnson (9) || US Airways Center  9,620 || 18–13 
|- align="center" bgcolor="bbffbb"
| 32 || September 8 || 10:00pm || Tulsa || NBATVCOX || 91–76 || Taurasi (21) || Bonner (10) || Swanier (9) || US Airways Center  8,189 || 19–13 
|- align="center" bgcolor="ffbbbb"
| 33 || September 9 || 10:00pm || @ Seattle || KONG || 70–85 || Taurasi (36) || Bonner (14) || Johnson (3) || KeyArena  9,686 || 19–14 
|- align="center" bgcolor="ffbbbb"
| 34 || September 11 || 6:00pm || Minnesota || FS-A || 90–96 || Taurasi (19) || Dupree (6) || Swanier (4) || US Airways Center  12,666 || 19–15 
|-

| All games are viewable on WNBA LiveAccess or ESPN3.com

Postseason

|- align="center" bgcolor="ffbbbb"
| 1 || September 15 || 10:00pm || @ Seattle || ESPN2 || 61–80 || Taylor (13) || Bonner (8) || JohnsonSwanierTaylor (3) || KeyArena  7,279 || 0–1 
|- align="center" bgcolor="bbffbb"
| 2 || September 17 || 10:00pm || Seattle || NBATV || 92–83 || Dupree (29) || Dupree (13) || Johnson (9) || US Airways Center  9,356 || 1–1
|- align="center" bgcolor="bbffbb"
| 3 || September 19 || 10:00pm || @ Seattle || ESPN2 || 77–75 || Dupree (20) || Taylor (17) || JohnsonTaurasi (3) || KeyArena  8,589 || 2–1
|-

|- align="center" bgcolor="ffbbbb"
| 1 || September 22 || 9:00pm || @ Minnesota || ESPN2 || 67–95 || Taurasi (22) || Bonner (8) || Johnson (4) || Target Center  8,912 || 0–1
|- align="center" bgcolor="ffbbbb"
| 2 || September 25 || 5:00pm || Minnesota || ESPN2 || 86–103 || BonnerTaurasi (22) || Dupree (11) || Johnson (6) || US Airways Center  8,617 || 0–2
|-

Statistics

Regular season

Awards and honors
Candice Dupree was named WNBA Western Conference Player of the Week for the week of June 13, 2011.
Penny Taylor was named WNBA Western Conference Player of the Week for the week of June 20, 2011.
Diana Taurasi was named WNBA Western Conference Player of the Week for the week of August 8, 2011.
DeWanna Bonner was named WNBA Western Conference Player of the Week for the week of August 29, 2011.
Diana Taurasi was named to the 2011 WNBA All-Star Team as a starter.
Penny Taylor was named to the 2011 WNBA All-Star Team as a reserve.
Diana Taurasi finished as a Peak Performer, averaging 21.6 points per game.
DeWanna Bonner was named Sixth Woman of the Year.
Diana Taurasi was named to the All-WNBA First Team.
Penny Taylor was named to the All-WNBA Second Team.

References

External links

Phoenix Mercury seasons
Phoenix
Phoenix Mercury